= Nibal Madhat Badr =

- Military career
- Rank: Brigadier general

Brigadier General Nibal Madhat Badr is a former Syrian army officer during Ba'athist Syria.

Badr is originally from the port city of Tartus. On 1 July 2017 she was appointed to the rank of Brigadier General and became the first female general officer in the Syrian Armed Forces. It came at a time of accelerated integration of women into the Syrian military and police forces, during the ongoing Syrian Civil War.
